The Turkish Cup (Turkish: Türkiye Kupası) is a football cup competition in Turkish football, run by the Turkish Football Federation since 1962. During a brief sponsorship period with Fortis, its sponsored name was Fortis Türkiye Kupası. Now Ziraat Bankası is the sponsor and the sponsored name for the cup is Ziraat Türkiye Kupası.

The cup was created in 1962 and has taken place every year since then. Many different formats, including a pure knockout competition and group stages, have been tried and finally for the 2012–13 season, an expanded tournament format has been adopted. A record 156 teams compete in the tournament. After five knockout rounds, a round-robin group stage is contested. Group winners and runners-up play in semi-finals and finals. Sivasspor are the current holders of the cup.

Tournament format

The current format of the Turkish Cup consists of 156 clubs from the top four leagues of the Turkish football league system and the Turkish Regional Amateur League. The first round consists of 86 clubs from the TFF Third League and Turkish Regional Amateur League. The second round consists of winners from the first round alongside clubs from the Süper Lig, TFF First League and TFF Second League. Teams playing in the UEFA Champions League and UEFA Europa League enter at the fourth round. After the fifth round, 8 winners are drawn into two groups of four teams and play in a round-robin tournament. Winners and runners-up of the groups play in semi-finals as two-legged ties. Winners of the semi-finals play the final match in a neutral ground.

The final consists of a single match that takes place in a neutral setting. The winner of the cup earns a spot in the third qualifying round of the UEFA Europa League, and also plays in the Turkish Super Cup against the Süper Lig champions.

Trophy and prize money

Turkish Football Federation awards the Turkish Cup trophy (current design is seen on the right) to the winners of the final. Cup winners and runners-up receive 50 medals each. Also, prize money is given away. TFF awards prizes not by winning a round, but just by reaching the round. The final match is an exception, where runners-up receive less than cup winners. The prize money is in United States dollars. A sum of $10,500,000 worth prize money is awarded to participating teams. As an honour of the tournament, the cup winner club wears a roundel of the Turkish flag in the next footballing season.

Winners

Key

Two-legged finals

Single-legged finals

Performance by club

Finals venues and host cities

Records

Most common finals matchups

Final
Most wins: 18
Galatasaray (1963, 1964, 1965, 1966, 1973, 1976, 1982, 1985, 1991, 1993, 1996, 1999, 2000, 2005, 2014, 2015, 2016, 2019)
Most consecutive titles: 4
Galatasaray (1963, 1964, 1965, 1966)
Most consecutive appearances: 4
Galatasaray (1963, 1964, 1965, 1966 - winning all)
Trabzonspor (1975, 1976, 1977, 1978 - winning two)
Galatasaray (1993, 1994, 1995, 1996 - winning two)
Most appearances: 23
Galatasaray (1963, 1964, 1965, 1966, 1969, 1973, 1976, 1980, 1982, 1985, 1991, 1993, 1994, 1995, 1996, 1998, 1999, 2000, 2005, 2014, 2015, 2016, 2019)
Biggest win:
Gençlerbirliği 5–0 Eskişehirspor (1987)
Most goals in a final: 8
Antalyaspor 3–5 Galatasaray (2000)
Most goals by a losing side: 3
Antalyaspor 3–5 Galatasaray (2000)
Most defeats in a final: 11
Fenerbahçe (1963, 1965, 1989, 1996, 2001, 2005, 2006, 2009, 2010, 2016, 2018)

Unbeaten
Longest unbeaten run: 26
Galatasaray, 1962–63 to 1966–67 quarter-finals 2nd leg vs Altay

Scorelines
Biggest home win
14–2, İskenderun Demir Çelikspor vs Fidan Gençlik S.K., Round 2, 1980–1981
Biggest away win
1–10, Uşak Belediyespor vs Denizli B.S.K., Second round, 2012–2013

Individual records

All-time most appearances

As of 26 May 2019

All-time top scorers

As of 26 May 2019

Manager

Players
(at least 5 titles)

See also
Turkish Super Cup

References

External links

Turkey - List of Cup Finals, RSSSF.com
Turkish Cup summary (SOCCERWAY)
 Turkish Cup - Hailoosport.com

 
Turkey
Recurring sporting events established in 1962
1962 establishments in Turkey
1